Death of a Salesman is a 1966 American made-for-television film adaptation of the 1949 play of the same name by Arthur Miller. It was directed by Alex Segal and adapted for television by Miller. It received numerous nominations for awards, and won several of them, including three Primetime Emmy Awards, a Directors Guild of America Award and a Peabody Award. It was nominated in a total of 11 Emmy categories at the 19th Primetime Emmy Awards in 1967. Lee J. Cobb reprised his role as Willy Loman and Mildred Dunnock reprised her role as Linda Loman from the original 1949 stage production.

Playbill markets this version of the play as an "abbreviated" one. Although the performance is abridged, it was adapted for television by Miller himself, meaning that not much substance was lost in the changes. The production was filmed after several weeks of rehearsals.

It was a 1966 CBS television adaptation, which included Gene Wilder, James Farentino, Bernie Kopell and George Segal. Cobb was nominated for an Emmy Award for the performance. Mildred Dunnock, who had co-starred in both the original stage version and the 1951 film version, again repeated her role as Linda, Willy's devoted wife, and earned an Emmy nomination. In addition to being Emmy-nominated, Cobb and Dunnock were Grammy Award-nominated at the 9th Grammy Awards in 1967 in the category of Best Spoken Word, Documentary or Drama Recording.  This movie is one of several adaptations of the play and was contemporaneous with a May 1966 BBC version starring Rod Steiger and produced by Alan Cooke.

The production marked the acclaimed reunion of the leading actor and actress from the original 1949 broadway cast. The performance also marks a strong dramatic turn for George Segal who is known for his comic work, while a young Gene Wilder presents a comic but sensitive performance as Bernard.

Cast
Main Cast
Lee J. Cobb as Willy Loman
Mildred Dunnock as Linda Loman
James Farentino as Happy 'Hap' Loman
George Segal as Biff Loman
Gene Wilder as Bernard

Supporting Cast
Albert Dekker as Uncle Ben
Edward Andrews as Charley
Marge Redmond as Woman in Hotel
Bernie Kopell as Howard Wagner
Stanley Adams as Stanley
Joan Patrick as Miss Forsythe
Karen Steele as Letta
June Foray as Jenny

Reception
New York Times television critic Jack Gould praised the production as an "evening of exalted theater," and described it as "a revelation of Arthur Miller's 'Death of a Salesman' that will stand as the supreme understanding of the tragedy of Willy Loman." Joan Crosby of The Pittsburgh Press praised all members of the Loman family for their performances and described the performance as "An evening of high drama, not to be missed". United Press International critic Rick Du Brow noted that the first television adaptation earned a place in history: "it promptly took its place among the most unforgettable productions in the history of the video medium." Du Brow praised Cobb's performance as great, Dunnock as a "bastion of strength decency and human understanding," Segal as "superb" and Farentino as "outstanding". Associated Press correspondent Cynthia Lowry described the show as a powerful depiction of "tense, sometimes painful drama" told mostly by flashbacks from happier times. Lowry described Cobb's distraught performance as "overwhelming", Dunnock's portrayal of the "loving, patient and blindly loyal wife" equally powerful and the performances of both sons as sensitive.

Segal won Directors Guild of America Award for Outstanding Directing – Television Film and the Emmy Award for Outstanding Directorial Achievement in Drama at the 19th Primetime Emmy Awards in 1967. Producers Susskind and Melnick also won the Emmy for Outstanding Dramatic Program. Meanwhile, Miller won the Emmy for Special Classifications of Individual Achievements as the adaptor. Cobb and Dunnock were Emmy-nominated for Outstanding Single Performance by an Actor in a Leading Role in a Drama and Outstanding Single Performance by an Actress in a Leading Role in a Drama, respectively.

The production earned two Emmy nominations in Individual Achievements in Art Direction and Allied Crafts classifications and four in Individual Achievements in Electronic Production classifications. Du Brow noted that the camera work made the transitions between Willy's temporal wanderings smooth and that the color use was also essential to the mood of the scenes.

Awards
1966 Directors Guild of America Award
Outstanding Directorial Achievement in Television
Alex Segal Won
James B. Clark (associate director) (plaque)
 
1967 (19th) Emmy Awards
Outstanding Directorial Achievement in Drama
Alex Segal Won

Outstanding Dramatic Program
David Susskind (producer) Won
Daniel Melnick (producer) Won

Special Classifications of Individual Achievements
Arthur Miller (adapter) Won

Individual Achievements in Art Direction and Allied Crafts – Art Direction
Tom H. John (art director)

Individual Achievements in Art Direction and Allied Crafts – Art Direction
Earl Carlson (set decorator)

Individual Achievements in Electronic Production – Electronic Cameramen
Fred Gough (cameraman)
Robert Dunn (cameraman)
Jack Jennings (cameraman)
Richard Nelson (cameraman)
Gorm Erickson (cameraman)

Individual Achievements in Electronic Production – Lighting Directors
Leard Davis (lighting director)

Individual Achievements in Electronic Production – Technical Directors
A.J. Cunningham (technical director)

Individual Achievements in Electronic Production – Video Tape Editing
James E. Brady (video tape editor)

Primetime Emmy Award for Outstanding Single Performance by an Actor in a Leading Role in a Drama
Lee J. Cobb

Primetime Emmy Award for Outstanding Single Performance by an Actress in a Leading Role in a Drama
Mildred Dunnock

1966 Peabody Awards
Personal Award 	
Tom H. John Won – (Also for Color Me Barbra and The Strolin' Twenties)

1967 (9th) Grammy Awards
Best Spoken Word, Documentary or Drama Recording
Lee J. Cobb
Mildred Dunnock

See also
List of American films of 1966

References

External links
 
 
 

1966 television films
1966 films
1966 drama films
CBS network films
Films with screenplays by Arthur Miller
Films directed by Alex Segal
Films directed by James B. Clark
Films set in Brooklyn
American films based on plays
1960s English-language films